The Turks and Caicos Islands women's national football team is the national women's football team of Turks and Caicos Islands and is overseen by the Turks and Caicos Islands Football Association.

Results and fixtures

The following is a list of match results in the last 12 months, as well as any future matches that have been scheduled.

Legend

2022

Players

Current squad
The following players were called up for the match against Trinidad and Tobago on 9 April 2022.

Recent call-ups
The following players have also been called up to the Turks and Caicos Islands squad within the last 12 months.

Competitive record

FIFA Women's World Cup

*Draws include knockout matches decided on penalty kicks.

CONCACAF W Championship

*Draws include knockout matches decided on penalty kicks.

Coaches 

  Darren Meehan (2015-2016)
  Yunelsis Rodríguez (2018-)

References

External links
Official website
FIFA Profile